Edificio Ariztía is a building located at 52 Nueva York Street in downtown Santiago, Chile, on a wedge-shaped city block. It was completed in 1921 and is considered the first "skyscraper" in Santiago. The building, constructed in reinforced concrete, was the first office building in Santiago with an elevator.

References

Buildings and structures in Santiago
Skyscrapers in Chile
Skyscraper office buildings
Office buildings in Chile
Office buildings completed in 1921
1921 establishments in Chile